Leon Schlumpf (3 February 1925 – 7 July 2012) was a Swiss politician and a former member of the Swiss Federal Council (1979–1987).

Schlumpf was born in Felsberg.  He was elected to the Federal Council on 5 December 1979 as a member of the Swiss People's Party (SVP) from the Canton of Graubünden (Grisons). He subsequently handed over office on 31 December 1987. 

During his time in office, he held the Federal Department of Transport, Communications and Energy and was President of the Confederation in 1984.

Schlumpf died on 7 July 2012 in Chur, aged 87.  He was the father of Eveline Widmer-Schlumpf, member of the cantonal government of Graubünden (Grisons), who was herself elected to the Federal Council on 12 December 2007.

References

External links 
 
 

1925 births
2012 deaths
People from Imboden District
Swiss Calvinist and Reformed Christians
Swiss People's Party politicians
Conservative Democratic Party of Switzerland politicians
Members of the Federal Council (Switzerland)
Members of the National Council (Switzerland)
Members of the Council of States (Switzerland)
People from Chur